A coincidence is the occurrence of unrelated events in close proximity of space or time.

Coincidence may also refer to:

 Coincidence, mathematics term for a point tow mappings' domains sharing an image point; see Coincidence point
 Coincidence, scientific term for an instance of rays of light striking a surface at the same point and at the same time
 Coincidence, term for physical road bearing more than one designation; see Concurrency

Films 
 Coincidence, alternate English title for Blind Chance, the 1987 Polish film Przypadek by Krzysztof Kieślowski
 Coincidence, English title for the 1958 film Jogajog, based on the novel Jogajog 
 Coincidence, English title for the 1969 Bollywood film Ittefaq
Coincidence (1915 film), a short film distributed by General Film Company
 Coincidence (1921 film), an American silent film directed by Chet Withey and starring Robert Harron
 Coincidences (film), a 1947 French film directed by Serge Debecque

See also 
 Concurrency (disambiguation)